FabricLive.59 is a 2011 DJ mix album by Four Tet. The album was released as part of the FabricLive Mix Series. Hebden's two previous mix albums, for the DJ-KiCKS and Late Night Tales series, contained many different genres of music, but FabricLive.59 featured only electronic dance music, heavily slanted towards UK Garage. Hebden also used field recordings made at the club as part of the mix.

Track listing

References

External links
Fabric: FabricLive.59

Fabric (club) albums
2011 compilation albums
Albums produced by Kieran Hebden